Ishtiyāq,  meaning "longing" or "craving", is a personal name mostly used as name used for a male child in the Muslim, popularly used by Muslims in the Indian subcontinent. It's also spelled as Ishtyaq, Ishtiaqe and Ishtiaque. Notable people with the name include:

Ishtiaq Ahmad, multiple people 
Ishtiaq Mubarak (1948–2013), Malaysian hurdler
Ishtiaq Muhammad (born 1992), Hong Kong cricketer
Farhat Ishtiaq (born 1980), Pakistani writer

References

External links
 "Ishtiaq" at www.all-babynames.com

Arabic masculine given names